Graigue–Ballycallan is a Gaelic Athletic Association club situated in County Kilkenny, Ireland. The club has enjoyed success at county and provincial level, and several players from the club have gone on to play a part in the Kilkenny intercounty team. The catchment area for the club is the villages of Kilmanagh, Ballycallan and Graigue Cross. They play their home matches in Tom Ryall Park, which is situated in Kilmanagh. The current senior hurling manager is Tipperary native and former Antrim hurling manager Dinny Cahill.

Honours

Kilkenny Senior Hurling Championships: 3
 1949, 1998, 2000
Leinster Senior Club Hurling Championships: 1
 2000
All-Ireland Senior Club Hurling Championship: Runners-up
 2001
 Kilkenny Intermediate Hurling Championships: 2
 1987, 2018
Leinster Intermediate Club Hurling Championships: 1
 2018
 Kilkenny Junior Hurling Championships: 2
 1946, 1985
 Kilkenny Minor Hurling Championships: 4
 1948, 1949, 1994, 1996
 Kilkenny Under-21 Hurling Championships: 1
 1997

Notable hurlers
 Eddie Brennan
 Denis Byrne
 Bill Cahill
 John Hoyne
 Mick Kenny
 Joe Millea
 Adrian Ronan
 James Ryall
 Billy Ryan

External links
 Information on the KilkennyCats website

Gaelic games clubs in County Kilkenny
Hurling clubs in County Kilkenny